Francesco Cavazzone (1559–1612) was an Italian painter of the early-Baroque period.
He trained with Ludovico Carracci and Bartolomeo Passarotti. He completed a Christ preaching to the Magdalen for the Maddalena in Bologna. He also wrote art history.

References

1559 births
1612 deaths
16th-century Italian painters
Italian male painters
17th-century Italian painters
Painters from Bologna
Italian Baroque painters
Italian Mannerist painters
Italian art historians